Carr Community, Florida is located on Florida State Road 73, one mile north of its intersection with State Road 20 at Clarksville. It is home to Carr Elementary and Middle Schools, as well as several churches: Poplar Head Baptist Church, Travelers Rest Freewill Baptist, and Carr Advent Church.  It also has a public park at Four Mile Creek with picnic tables, restrooms, tennis courts, and a baseball field.  It is also near Chipola River Park on State Road 20, which has a public boat ramp.

Unincorporated communities in Calhoun County, Florida
Unincorporated communities in Florida